The Bodenfelde Black Widows were two German serial killers, who committed four murders from 1994 to 2000 in the Bodenfelde municipality.

Lydia L., a former prostitute born in 1939, invited older men to live with her in a relationship or to care for the elderly. The men were later murdered by her and her helper, Siegmund S. However, a turnaround occurred when her aide himself reported the crimes to the police, confessing his participation in them as well.

The following relationships were assigned to Lydia L.:

 Ludwig G. from Biebertal. In 1983, he met the women at the age of 82. In September 1985, he pointed at Lydia for being his sole heir, and on January 5, 1986, he died in a hospital.
 Wilhelm S., a master mason from the Sauerland.
 Paul P., who died at the age of 83 in February 1991.
 Alois M.
 Günter S., 74, strangled in June 1994.
 Adolf B. from Melsungen, was suffocated in September 1994 with a pillow.
 Paul G., stunned by Lydia L. in April 1995 and then strangled by Siegmund S.
 Gerhard G., smothered with a plastic bag by the two offenders on July 13, 2000, in his house in Völksen, near Hanover.

In the last four cases, the court recognized as murders. Lydia L. was sentenced to life imprisonment in 2009 by the District Court of Göttingen, and she is now serving in the Vechta Prison. A revision submitted by her was unsuccessful.

Lydia's accomplice Siegmund S. was sentenced to 12 years imprisonment, which he served in the Rosdorf correctional facility. By his own account, he said that he had been afraid of being poisoned.

In 2014, Lydia L. sued the new owner of her house, who was said to have disposed of personal belongings without her permission. The claim was dismissed by the court.

See also 

 List of serial killers by country

External links 

 Christian Saehrendt, Steen T. Kittl: All Bluff! How we become imposters without wanting to. Or maybe yes?. Heyne Verlag, 2011

References  

1939 births
1980s murders in Germany
1990s murders in Germany
2000 murders in Germany
Criminal duos
Criminals from Lower Saxony
German female serial killers
German serial killers
Mariticides
Possibly living people
Violence against men in Europe